Maxi Rodriguez (born August 9, 1995) is an American professional soccer player who currently plays as a midfielder for Detroit City FC in the USL Championship.

Career

College
Rodriguez played four years of college soccer at the University of North Carolina at Charlotte between 2013 and 2016.

Professional career
Rodriguez signed with San Antonio FC on February 22, 2017.

Rodriguez joined the Richmond Kickers on February 22, 2019. On March 30, 2019, Rodriguez made his Richmond debut scoring in a match against Lansing Ignite FC.

On March 22, 2021, Rodriguez signed with National Independent Soccer Association side Detroit City FC ahead of the 2021 season.

References

External links 
 
 

1995 births
Living people
American soccer players
Association football midfielders
Charlotte 49ers men's soccer players
Richmond Kickers players
San Antonio FC players
Soccer players from San Antonio
USL Championship players
USL League One players
Detroit City FC players